Sciforma, previously named PSNext, is an enterprise Project and Portfolio Management (PPM) software developed by Sciforma Corporation. Sciforma Corporation is an American software company based in San Jose, California. It is a Java web based cross-platform solution. It provides integration of portfolio, project, resource and document management and is completely configurable. The current software version is Sciforma 7.1. This version adds Single sign-on and an HTML5 interface enabling access from mobile devices or thin clients.

It runs on a Tomcat, WAS, Weblogic or JBoss application server with a PostgreSQL, Microsoft SQL Server, DB2 or Oracle database.

Sciforma has offices in France, Germany, UK, Australia and Japan and distributors in several other countries.
The software is available in 7 languages: English, French, German, Spanish, Japanese, Hebrew and Polish.

PSNext, first released in 2004, is the successor of Project Scheduler, developed by Sciforma since 1982.

Clients from different industries use Sciforma such as Societe de Transport de Montreal, Netgear, Boeing and Zodiac Aerospace.

Features and Methodologies 

Features of Sciforma include:

Project Management
Portfolio Management
Resource Management
Cost Management
Risk Management
Document Management
Time Reporting
Capacity Planning
Demand Management
Program Management
Work Management

Some of the methodologies included in Sciforma are: PMBOK, CCPM, Agile, Phase-Gate and PRINCE2.

Chronology of Versions 
January 2018 - Sciforma 7.1
March 2015 - Sciforma 7.0
September 2013 - Sciforma 6.0
June 2012 - Sciforma 5.0
September 2011 - Sciforma 4.0
January 2009 - PSNext 3.0
June 2006 - PSNext 2.0
March 2004 - PSNext 1.0

Reports from Analyst Firms

In 2009  and 2010, Sciforma was rated as a “visionary” by Gartner’s Magic Quadrant for IT Project and Portfolio Management.

In 2012, Sciforma received “Positive Rating” from Gartner in the MarketScope for Project and Portfolio Management Applications.

The Info-Tech Research Group ranked  Sciforma as an” innovator”  and designated them for their “Value Award” in their Enterprise Project Portfolio Management Vendor Landscape for 2014.

In 2015, Sciforma received “Challengers Rating” from Gartner in the Magic Quadrant for IT Project and Portfolio Management Software Applications, Worldwide.

References

External links
Sciforma official site
Gartner analysis (2006)
PMI Belgium review
Gartner PPM Magic Quadrant (2009)
BARC Project Management Study

Project management software
Collaborative software